Vladimir Petrovich Vilisov (born 19 April 1976) is a Russian cross-country skier. He competed in the men's 30 kilometre freestyle mass start event at the 2002 Winter Olympics.

Cross-country skiing results
All results are sourced from the International Ski Federation.

Olympic Games

World Championships

World Cup

Season standings

Individual podiums
 2 podiums – (2 )

Team podiums
 1 victory – (1 )
 10 podiums – (10 )

References

External links
 

1976 births
Living people
Russian male cross-country skiers
Olympic cross-country skiers of Russia
Cross-country skiers at the 2002 Winter Olympics
People from Novokuznetsk
Sportspeople from Kemerovo Oblast